Home Is Where the Hate Is is the first EP by UK punk rock band The Fight. It was released in 2003.

Track listing
"Forgotten Generation" (Turley, Turley) - 2:15
"Fish Gang" (Turley, Turley) - 2:02
"Home is where the hate is" (Turley, Turley) - 3:26
"Greebo wanabe" (Turley, Turley) - 2:56
"(I'm running around in) circles" (Mich Walker) - 3:15
"Stage skool kidz" (Turley, Turley) - 3:16
"Revolution calling" (Turley, Turley) - 3:03

Personnel
Kate - vocals, guitar 
Matt - bass
Jack - drums
Simon - guitar

The Fight (band) albums
2003 EPs
Fat Wreck Chords EPs